James William Buffett (born December 25, 1946) is an American singer-songwriter, musician, author, and businessman. He is best known for his music, which often portrays an "island escapism" lifestyle. Together with his Coral Reefer Band, Buffett has recorded hit songs including "Margaritaville" (ranked 234th on the Recording Industry Association of America's list of "Songs of the Century") and "Come Monday". He has a devoted base of fans known as "Parrotheads".

Aside from his career in music, Buffett is also a bestselling author and was involved in two restaurant chains named after two of his best-known songs; he currently owns the Margaritaville Cafe restaurant chain and co-developed the now defunct Cheeseburger in Paradise restaurant chain. Buffett is one of the world's richest musicians, with a net worth as of 2017 of $550 million.

Early and personal life 
Buffett was born on Christmas Day 1946, in Pascagoula, Mississippi, and spent part of his childhood in Mobile, Alabama. He later lived in Fairhope, Alabama. He is the son of Mary Lorraine (née Peets) and James Delaney Buffett Jr. During his grade school years, he attended St. Ignatius School, where he played the trombone in the school band. As a child he was exposed to sailing through his grandfather and these experiences would go on to influence his later music. He graduated from McGill Institute for Boys in 1964. He began playing guitar during his first year at Auburn University before continuing his college years at Pearl River Community College and the University of Southern Mississippi in Hattiesburg, Mississippi, where he received a bachelor's degree in history in 1969. He is an initiate of Kappa Sigma fraternity at the University of Southern Mississippi. After graduating from college, Buffett worked as a correspondent for Billboard magazine in Nashville, breaking the news of the separation of Flatt and Scruggs.

Buffett married Margie Washichek in 1969; they divorced in 1971. Buffett spent years working as the first mate on the yacht of industrialist Foster Talge on the Petticoat III in Key West while perfecting the "Caribbean Rock n' Roll" genre. Buffett and his second wife, Jane (née Slagsvol) have two daughters, Savannah Jane and Sarah Delaney (Sarah was almost named Sara Loraine, after her grandmother, but was named Sarah Delaney after her grandfather), and an adopted son, Cameron Marley, and reside in Sag Harbor, New York, and Palm Beach, Florida. They separated in the early 1980s, but reconciled in 1991. Buffett also owns a home in Saint Barts, a Caribbean island where he lived on and off in the early 1980s while he was part owner of the Autour de Rocher hotel and restaurant. He spends part of the summer traveling about the East Coast on his sailboat. An avid pilot, Buffett owns a Dassault Falcon 900 that he often uses while on concert tour and traveling worldwide. He has also owned a Boeing Stearman, Cessna Citation, Lake Amphibian, and Grumman Albatross.

On Thursday, August 25, 1994 around 3:00 pm Eastern time, Jimmy Buffett crashed his Grumman G-44 Widgeon, N1471N, while attempting to takeoff in the waters off Nantucket, Massachusetts. The airplane nosed over, and Jimmy was able to swim to safety, sustaining only minor injuries.

His father died May 1, 2003, at the age of 83 and then his mother died four months later on September 25.

In 2015, Buffett spoke at the University of Miami's graduation ceremony and received an honorary doctorate in music. Wearing flip flops and aviator sunglasses, he told graduates, from a line in his song "The Pascagoula Run", that "it's time to see the world, time to kiss a girl, and time to cross the wild meridian."

Buffett is a supporter of the Democratic Party and has hosted fundraisers for Democratic politicians, including one for Hillary Clinton in 2016.

Music

Music career
Buffett began his musical career in Nashville, Tennessee, during the late 1960s as a country artist and recorded his first album, the country-tinged folk rock record Down to Earth, in 1970. During this time, Buffett could be frequently found busking for tourists in New Orleans. Fellow country singer Jerry Jeff Walker took him to Key West on a busking expedition in November 1971. Buffett then moved to Key West and began establishing the easy-going beach-bum persona for which he is known. He started out playing for drinks at the Chart Room Bar in the Pier House Motel. Following this move, Buffett combined country, rock, folk, calypso and pop music with coastal as well as tropical lyrical themes for a sound sometimes called "Gulf and Western" (or tropical rock). Today, he is a regular visitor to the Caribbean island of Saint Barts and other islands where he gets inspiration for many of his songs and some of the characters in his books.

With the untimely death of friend and mentor Jim Croce in September 1973, ABC/Dunhill Records tapped Buffett to fill his space. Earlier, Buffett had visited Croce's farm in Pennsylvania and met with Croce in Florida.

Buffett's second release was 1973's A White Sport Coat and a Pink Crustacean. Albums Living & Dying in 3/4 Time and A1A both followed in 1974, Havana Daydreamin' appeared in 1976, and Changes in Latitudes, Changes in Attitudes followed in 1977, which featured the breakthrough hit song "Margaritaville".

During the 1980s, Buffett made far more money from his tours than his albums and became known as a popular concert draw. He released a series of albums during the following 20 years, primarily to his devoted audience, and also branched into writing and merchandising. In 1985, Buffett opened a "Margaritaville" retail store in Key West, and in 1987, he opened the Margaritaville Cafe.

In 1994, Buffett dueted with Frank Sinatra on a cover of "Mack the Knife" on Sinatra's final studio album, "Duets II". In 1997, Buffett collaborated with novelist Herman Wouk to create a musical based on Wouk's novel, Don't Stop the Carnival. Broadway showed little interest in the play (following the failure of Paul Simon's The Capeman), and it ran only for six weeks in Miami. He released an album of songs from the musical in 1998.

In August 2000, Buffett and the Coral Reefer Band played on the White House lawn for then-President Bill Clinton.

In 2003, he partnered in a partial duet with Alan Jackson for the song "It's Five O'Clock Somewhere", a number-one hit on the country charts. This song won the 2003 Country Music Association Award for Vocal Event of the Year. This was Buffett's first award in his 30-year recording career.

Buffett's album License to Chill, released on July 13, 2004, sold 238,600 copies in its first week of release according to Nielsen Soundscan. With this, Buffett topped the U.S. pop albums chart for the first time in his  career.

Buffett continues to tour every year, although he has shifted recently to a more relaxed schedule of around 20–30 dates, with infrequent back-to-back nights, preferring to play only on Tuesdays, Thursdays, and Saturdays. This schedule provided the title of his 1999 live album.

In the summer of 2005, Buffett teamed up with Sirius Satellite Radio and introduced Radio Margaritaville. Until this point, Radio Margaritaville was solely an online channel. Radio Margaritaville has remained on the service through Sirius' merger with XM Radio and currently appears as XM 24. The channel broadcasts from the Margaritaville Resort Orlando in Kissimmee, Florida.

In August 2006, he released the album Take the Weather with You. The song "Breathe In, Breathe Out, Move On" on this album is in honor of the survivors of 2005's Hurricane Katrina. Buffett's rendition of "Silver Wings" on the same album was made as a tribute to Merle Haggard. On August 30, 2007, he received his star on the Mohegan Sun Walk of Fame.

On April 20, 2010, a double CD of performances recorded during the 2008 and 2009 tours called Encores was released exclusively at Walmart, Walmart.com, and Margaritaville.com.

Buffett partnered in a duet with the Zac Brown Band on the song "Knee Deep"; released on Brown's 2010 album You Get What You Give, it became a hit country and pop single in 2011. Also in 2011, Buffett voiced Huckleberry Finn on Mark Twain: Words & Music, which was released on Mailboat Records. The project is a benefit for the Mark Twain Boyhood Home & Museum and includes Clint Eastwood as Mark Twain, Garrison Keillor as the narrator, and songs by Brad Paisley, Sheryl Crow, Ricky Skaggs, Vince Gill, Emmylou Harris, and others.

Of the over 30 albums Jimmy Buffett has released, as of October 2007, eight are Gold albums and nine are Platinum or Multiplatinum. In 2007, Buffett was nominated for the CMA Event of the Year Award for his song "Hey Good Lookin'" which featured Alan Jackson and George Strait.

In 2020 Buffett released Songs You Don't Know by Heart, a fan-curated collection of his lesser-known songs rerecorded on his collection of notable guitars.

Musical style

Buffett began calling his music "drunken Caribbean rock 'n' roll" as he says on his 1978 live album You Had To Be There. Earlier,  Buffett himself and others had used the term "Gulf and Western" to describe his musical style and that of other similar-sounding performers. The name derives from elements in Buffett's early music including musical influence from country, along with lyrical themes from the Gulf Coast. A music critic described Buffett's music as a combination of "tropical languor with country funkiness into what some [have] called the Key West sound, or Gulf-and-western." The term is a play on the form of "Country & Western" and the name of the former conglomerate and Paramount Pictures parent Gulf+Western. In 2020, The Associated Press described Buffett's sound as a "special Gulf Coast blend of country, pop, folk and rock, topped by Buffett's swaying voice. Few can mix steelpans, trombones and pedal steel guitar so effortlessly." The DC Metro Theatre Arts magazine, in a review for Buffett's musical Escape to Margaritaville, described Buffett's music as "blend[ing] Caribbean, country, rock, folk, and pop music into a good-natured concoction variously classified as "trop rock" or "Gulf and western"."

Other performers identified as Gulf and Western are often deliberately derivative of Buffett's musical style and some are tribute bands, or in the case of Greg "Fingers" Taylor, a former member of Buffett's Coral Reefer Band. They can be heard on Buffett's online Radio Margaritaville and on the compilation album series Thongs in the Key of Life. Gulf and Western performers include Norman "the Caribbean Cowboy" Lee, Jim Bowley, Kenny Chesney, and Jim Morris.

Fans 

Parrot Head or parrothead is a commonly used nickname for Buffett fans with "parakeets" or "keets" used for younger fans, or children of Parrotheads. At a Buffett 1985 concert at the Timberwolf Amphitheater in Cincinnati, Ohio Buffett commented about everyone wearing Hawaiian shirts and parrot hats and how they kept coming back to see his shows, just like Deadheads. Timothy B. Schmit, then a member of the Coral Reefer Band, coined the term "Parrot Head" to describe them. In 1989, the first Parrothead club was founded in Atlanta. Subsequent Events range from single-act concerts or happy hours to the annual Meeting of the Minds in Key West, Florida, which attracts approximately 5,000 Parrotheads. In 2011, there were 239 Parrothead Club chapters in the United States, Canada and Australia, spanning 3 countries, 47 states and 3 Canadian provinces with total membership of almost 28,000. The Pikes Peak Hash House Harriers and Harriettes have an annual Parrot Head Hash weekend hosted by Yeastee Boy and Bread Box.

Writing

Buffett has written three number-one best sellers. Tales from Margaritaville and Where Is Joe Merchant? both spent over seven months on The New York Times Best Seller fiction list. His memoir A Pirate Looks at Fifty, published in 1998, went straight to number one on the New York Times Best Seller nonfiction list, making him one of the few authors to have reached number one on both the fiction and nonfiction lists.

Buffett also co-wrote two children's books, The Jolly Mon and Trouble Dolls, with his eldest daughter, Savannah Jane Buffett. The original hardcover release of The Jolly Mon included a cassette tape recording of the two reading the story accompanied by an original score written by Michael Utley.

Buffett's novel A Salty Piece of Land was released on November 30, 2004, and the first edition of the book included a CD single of the song "A Salty Piece of Land", which was recorded for License to Chill. The book was a New York Times best seller soon after its release.

Buffett's latest title, Swine Not?, was released on May 13, 2008.

Buffett is one of several popular "philosophers" whose quotations appear on the road signs of Project HIMANK in the Ladakh region of Northern India.

Film and television
Buffett wrote the soundtrack for, and co-produced and played a role in, the 2006 film Hoot, directed by Wil Shriner and based on the book by Carl Hiaasen, which focused on issues important to Buffett, such as conservation. The film was not a critical or commercial success. Among his other film music credits are the theme song to the short-lived 1993 CBS television series Johnny Bago; "Turning Around" for the 1985 film Summer Rental starring John Candy; "I Don't Know (Spicoli's Theme)" for the film Fast Times at Ridgemont High; "Hello, Texas" for the 1980 John Travolta film Urban Cowboy; and "If I Have To Eat Someone (It Might As Well Be You)" for the animated film FernGully: The Last Rainforest, which was sung in the film by rap artist Tone Loc.

In addition, Buffett has made several cameo appearances, including in Repo Man, Hook, Cobb, Hoot, Congo, and From the Earth to the Moon. He also made cameo appearances as himself in Rancho Deluxe (for which he also wrote the music) and in FM. He made a guest appearance in the second season of Hawaii Five-0 on CBS in 2011 and returned in April 2013, March 2015, January 2017,  March 2018, May 2019, and March 2020 playing Frank Bama. Buffett reportedly was offered a cameo role in Pirates of the Caribbean: The Curse of the Black Pearl, but declined the offer. In 1997, Buffett collaborated with novelist Herman Wouk on a musical production based on Wouk's 1965 novel Don't Stop the Carnival. In the South Park episode "Tonsil Trouble", an animated version of Buffett (but not voiced by Buffett) was seen singing "AIDSburger in Paradise" and "CureBurger in Paradise". Jimmy has also appeared on the Sesame Street special, Elmopalooza, singing "Caribbean Amphibian" with the popular Muppet, Kermit the Frog. Buffett appeared in an episode of Hawaii Five-0 in November 2011. He played a helicopter pilot named Frank Bama, a character from his novel Where Is Joe Merchant?. Another character mentioned that he preferred "margaritas"; Buffett's character replied, "Can't argue with you there."  He reprised the role with a brief cameo visiting McGarret on the March 30, 2018, episode "E Ho'oko Kuleana".

Buffett made a cameo in the 2015 film Jurassic World, where he is seen holding two margaritas while the dinosaurs are set loose in the park.

In 2017, Buffett was the musical guest on the NCIS: New Orleans episode "Rogue Nation", playing the song "I Will Play for Gumbo" in Dwayne Pride's (Scott Bakula) newly rebuilt bar.

In 2019, he had an extended cameo playing himself in the Harmony Korine film The Beach Bum.

Business ventures

Buffett has taken advantage of his name and the fan following for his music to launch several business ventures, usually with a tropical theme. He opened the Margaritaville Cafe in Key West, Florida, in 1987. He owns LandShark Bar & Grill in Baltimore, Maryland and previously owned Cheeseburger in Paradise Restaurant. As a baseball fan, he was part-owner of two minor-league teams: the Fort Myers Miracle and the Madison Black Wolf. Buffett has also licensed Margaritaville Tequila, Margaritaville Footwear, and a Margaritaville Foods, including chips, salsa, guacamole, shrimp, chicken, and more. Between his businesses, album sales, and tours, he was estimated by Forbes to earn US$50.5 million in 2017 and to have a net worth of $550 million.

Record labels
In 1993, he launched Margaritaville Records, with distribution through MCA Records. His MCA record deal ended with the release of 1996's Christmas Island and he took Margaritaville Records over to Chris Blackwell's Island Records for a two-record deal, 1998's Don't Stop The Carnival and 1999's Beach House on the Moon. In the fall of 1999, he started Mailboat Records to release live albums. He entered into a partnership with RCA Records for distribution in 2005 and 2006 for the two studio albums License To Chill and Take The Weather With You.

Beer production
In 2006, Buffett launched a cooperative project with the Anheuser-Busch brewing company to produce beer under the Margaritaville Brewing label called LandShark Lager.

Casinos
Margaritaville Casino opened at the Resorts Casino Hotel in Atlantic City, New Jersey, in May 2013. The center features a restaurant, two bars, a coffee shop, a retail store, and a gaming area.

Football
From May 8, 2009, through January 5, 2010, Sun Life Stadium (formerly Dolphin Stadium) in Miami, the home of the Miami Dolphins, was named LandShark Stadium pursuant to an eight-month naming rights deal. Buffett also wrote new lyrics for the team to his 1979 song "Fins", which is played during Dolphins home games. Despite Buffett's partnership with the Dolphins, Buffett is a diehard New Orleans Saints fan, having attended the team's first game at Tulane Stadium in 1967 and later had Saints head coach Sean Payton serve as an honorary member of the Coral Reefer Band at a concert in New Orleans on April 1, 2012, in protest of Payton's suspension by the National Football League as a result of the Saints' bounty scandal.

Video games
In 2012, a "Margaritaville Online" game was released by THQ for Facebook.  The game was discontinued two years later.  In 2016, it was announced that Buffett had partnered with FunPlus to develop a new Margaritaville game.

Real estate
Latitude Margaritaville is a $1 billion retirement village planned in Daytona Beach, Florida. The project is a joint venture between Minto Communities and Buffett's Margaritaville Holdings, with the development being built on land close to LPGA Boulevard and about a mile to the west of Interstate 95.

As of 2021, the community has sold over 1,000 homes and will have 3,900 homes upon completion. Prices currently range from the low $200,000s to the low $500,000s.

Minto Communities and Margaritaville Holdings have since announced and began selling in Latitude Margaritaville Hilton Head in Bluffton, South Carolina and Latitude Margaritaville Watersound in Panama City Beach, Florida.

Cannabis
In 2018, Buffett teamed with businessman Beau Wrigley and Surterra Holdings, Inc. to license "Coral Reefer" brand marijuana by summer 2019.

Theatrical works
In 1994, Buffett began developing a musical based on Herman Wouk's 1965 novel, Don't Stop the Carnival.  Buffett wrote the music and lyrics and Wouk wrote the book for the show.  Don't Stop the Carnival debuted in  Miami, Florida in 1997 to negative reviews from critics. In response, the producers approached Buffett and told him that Wouk needed to be fired and a more experienced playwright needed to rewrite Wouk's script.  Buffett refused to remove Wouk from the project and any further productions of the show were canceled.  Buffett turned the show into an album that was released in 1998.

A new musical, Escape to Margaritaville, opened at the La Jolla Playhouse in San Diego in May 2017 and ran until July.  The show then performed limited runs in New Orleans, Houston, and Chicago, and was well received by critics. The show features a book by Greg Garcia and Mike O'Malley and uses Buffett's classic songs, some of which he rewrote the lyrics to in order to better fit in the context of the story. The show began previews at the Marquis Theatre on Broadway on February 16, 2018, and officially opened on March 15 under the direction of Tony winner Christopher Ashley. The Broadway production received mixed reviews from New York critics. In June that same year, the producers announced that the production would close on July 1 after 29 previews and 124 regular performances. Along with the announcement of the show's Broadway closing, it was announced that a national tour would launch in Providence, Rhode Island, in the fall of 2019.

Charity work

Buffett has been involved in many charity efforts. In 1981, the Save the Manatee Club was founded by Buffett and former Florida governor Bob Graham. West Indian manatee In 1989, legislation was passed in Florida that introduced the "Save the Manatee" license plate, and earmarked funding for the Save the Manatee Club. One of the two manatees trained to interact with researchers at Mote Marine Laboratory is named Buffett after the singer. Buffett is also a longtime supporter of and major donor to the Gulf Specimen Marine Laboratory.

On November 23, 2004, Buffett raised funds with his Surviving the Storm hurricane relief concert in Orlando, Florida, to provide relief for hurricane victims in Florida, Alabama and the Caribbean affected by the four major hurricanes that year.

Buffett performed in Hong Kong on January 18, 2008, for a concert that raised US$63,000 for the Foreign Correspondents' Club Charity Fund. This was his first concert in Hong Kong and it sold out within weeks. Not only did Buffett perform for the groundlings for free, but he also paid for the concertgoers' tequila and beer.

On July 11, 2010, Buffett, a Gulf Coast native, put on a free concert on the beach in Gulf Shores, Alabama. The concert was Buffett's response to the BP oil disaster in the Gulf. The concert was aired on CMT television. The 35,000 free tickets were given away within minutes to help draw people back to Alabama's beaches. Buffett played several popular songs including "Fins", "Son of a Son of a Sailor", "A Pirate Looks at Forty" and modified versions of "Margaritaville" (where the lyrics were changed in the chorus to "now I know, it's all BP's fault") and "When the Coast is Clear" (the lyrics in the chorus also referencing the Deepwater Horizon disaster: "That's when it always happens / When greed and crude collide"). The concert featured Jesse Winchester and Allen Toussaint.

Controversies
The earliest controversy with Buffett was his recording of "God's Own Drunk" on the album Living and Dying in 3/4 Time. In 1983, the son of the late entertainer Lord Buckley sued Buffett for $11 million for copyright infringement, claiming that Buffett took parts of the monologue from Buckley's A Tribute to Buckley and claimed it as his own work in "God's Own Drunk". The suit also alleged that Buffett's "blasphemous" rendition presented to the public a distorted impression of Lord Buckley. A court injunction against Buffett prevented him from performing the song until the lawsuit was settled or resolved, so starting in 1983, Buffett would get to the part of his show where he would normally perform "God's Own Drunk", he would say that he was not allowed to play it because of the lawsuit and instead played a song he wrote called "The Lawyer and the Asshole" in which he accuses Buckley's son and lawyers of being greedy and tells them to "kiss his ass."

In January 1996, Buffett's Grumman HU-16 airplane named Hemisphere Dancer was shot at by Jamaican police, who believed the craft to be smuggling marijuana. The aircraft sustained minimal damage. The plane was carrying Buffett, as well as U2's Bono, his wife and two children, and Island Records producer Chris Blackwell, and co-pilot Bill Dindy. The Jamaican government acknowledged the mistake and apologized to Buffett, who penned the song "Jamaica Mistaica" for his Banana Wind album based on the experience.

Buffett's 1999 song "Math Suks" caused a brief media frenzy. The song was in fact promptly condemned by the US National Council of Teachers of Mathematics and the National Education Association for its alleged negative effect on children's education. Comedian Jon Stewart also criticized the song on The Daily Show during a segment called "Math Is Quite Pleasant".

On February 4, 2001, he was ejected from the American Airlines Arena in Miami during a basketball game between the Miami Heat and the New York Knicks for cursing. After the game, referee Joe Forte said that he ordered him moved during the fourth quarter because "there was a little boy sitting next to him and a lady sitting by him. He used some words he knows he shouldn't have used." Forte apparently did not know who Buffett was, and censured Heat coach Pat Riley because he thought Riley—who was trying to explain to him who Buffett was—was insulting him by asking if he had ever been a "Parrothead", the nickname for Buffett fans. Buffett did not comment immediately after the incident, but discussed it on The Today Show three days later.

On October 6, 2006, it was reported that Buffett had been detained by French customs officials in Saint Tropez for allegedly carrying over 100 pills of ecstasy.
Buffett's luggage was searched after his Dassault Falcon 900 private jet landed at Toulon-Hyères International Airport. He paid a fine of $300 and was released. A spokesperson for Buffett stated the pills in question were prescription drugs, but declined to name the drug or the health problem for which he was being treated. Buffett released a statement that the "ecstasy" was in fact a B-vitamin supplement known as Foltx.

Concerts and tours

"The Big 8" and standard songs
Before 2003, songs almost always played at every Buffett show were known as the Big 8. The "Big 8" were:
 "Margaritaville"
 "Come Monday"
 "Fins"
 "Volcano"
 "A Pirate Looks at Forty"
 "Cheeseburger in Paradise"
 "Why Don't We Get Drunk"
 "Changes in Latitudes, Changes in Attitudes"

All of the “Big Eight” songs were released prior to 1980 and all were included on the compilation album Songs You Know By Heart, which is Buffett's best-selling album. "One Particular Harbor" was added to the regular set list in the late 1990s, with "Son of a Son of a Sailor" and It's Five O'Clock Somewhere in the early 2000s. After 2004, "Why Don't We Get Drunk" was removed from the full-time list (although still played on some tours), creating a list of ten songs that are played at almost all of Buffett's concerts. Versions of Van Morrison's "Brown Eyed Girl" and Crosby, Stills and Nash's "Southern Cross" have been included on every tour during this time, although not at every performance. In the years 2010–2016, in 262 advertised appearances Buffett performed the song "Margaritaville" 248 times, "Son of a Son of a Sailor" 236, "Volcano" 235, "Changes in Latitudes, Changes in Attitudes" 235, "Come Monday" 235, "Fins" 232, "A Pirate Looks at Forty" 232, "Cheeseburger in Paradise" 228, "Five O'Clock Somewhere" 225, "One Particular Harbour" 221, and "Southern Cross" 220. (Many of the performances without the full group of songs had short set lists, such as guesting on television shows).

In an interview on KLBJ radio in Austin, Texas, on May 2, 2013, Buffett humorously referred to the fact that they have to "play the ten that everyone wants, or else we'll get killed", and then went on to play "It's Five O'Clock Somewhere" on air.

Tour accident
On January 26, 2011 (Australia Day), Buffett was performing a concert in Australia at Sydney's Hordern Pavilion and fell off the stage after an encore. A concert-goer said, "He just went over to the edge of the stage, like he had numerous times through the night, just to wave, and people were throwing stuffed toys and things at him. And he just took one step too many and just disappeared in a flash. He didn't have time to put his arms out to save himself or anything, he just dropped." Coincidentally, one of Australia's leading trauma surgeons was at the concert and close to the stage; Dr. Gordian Fulde treated Buffett at the scene. Fulde said, "I thought he'd broken his neck....  I heard the clunk of his head on a metal ledge, he has a deep gash on his scalp, which is all right now....  But at first I thought: this guy is going to be a spinal injury." Dr Fulde turned him on his side so he could breathe and administered first aid. Buffett regained consciousness within a few minutes. He was then transported to St Vincent's Hospital Emergency center for treatment and was discharged the next day. Buffett returned to Australia in 2012 for two shows in Brisbane and Melbourne, and made much fun of the incident during those shows. In the Melbourne show in the historic Palais Theatre in the Melbourne beachside suburb of St. Kilda, he presented additional verses of "Margaritaville" in which he made humorous references to the accident.

List 

 A Pink Crustacean Tour (1976)
 Changes in Latitudes, Changes in Attitudes Tour (1977)
 Cheeseburger in Paradise Tour (1978)
 You Had to Be There Tour / Volcano Tour (1979)
 A Hot Dog & A Road Map Tour (1980)
 Coconut Telegraph Tour (1981)
 Somewhere over China Tour (with broken leg) (1982)
 Homecoming Tour (1982)
 The Six-Stop American Tour (1983)
 Feeding Frenzy Tour (1984)
 Last Mango in Paris Tour (1985)
 Floridays Tour / World Tour of Florida (1986)
 A Parrot Looks at Forty Tour (1987)
 Cheap Vacation Tour / Hot Water Tour (1988)
 Off to See the Lizard Tour / Buffett Does Ballads Tour (1989)
 Jimmy's Jump Up Tour (1990)
 Outpost Tour (1991)
 Rece$$ion Rece$$ Tour (1992)
 Chameleon Caravan Tour (1993)
 Fruitcakes Tour (1994)
 Domino College Tour (1995)
 Banana Wind Tour (1996)
 Havana Daydreamin' Tour (1997)
 Don't Stop the Carnival Tour (1998)
 Beach House on the Moon Tour (1999)
 Tuesdays, Thursdays, Saturdays Tour (2000)
 A Beach Odyssey Tour (2001)
 Far Side of the World Tour (2002)
 Tiki Time Tour (2003)
 License to Chill Tour (2004)
 A Salty Piece of Land Tour (2005)
 Party at the End of the World Tour (2006)
 Bama Breeze Tour (2007)
 Year of Still Here Tour (2008)
 Summerzcool Tour (2009)
 Under the Big Top Tour (2010)
 Welcome to Fin Land Tour (2011)
 Lounging at the Lagoon Tour (2012–13)
 Songs from St. Somewhere Tour (2013–14)
 This One's for You Tour (2014–15)
 Workin' n' Playin' Tour (2015–16)
 I Don't Know Tour (2016–18)
 Son of a Son of a Sailor Tour (2018–19)
 Life on the Flip Side Tour (2021–22)
 Second Wind Tour (2023-present)

Discography

 Down to Earth (1970)
 A White Sport Coat and a Pink Crustacean (1973)
 Living and Dying in 3/4 Time (1974)
 A1A (1974)
 Havana Daydreamin' (1976)
 High Cumberland Jubilee (1976)
 Changes in Latitudes, Changes in Attitudes (1977)
 Son of a Son of a Sailor (1978)
 Volcano (1979)
 Coconut Telegraph (1981)
 Somewhere over China (1982)
 One Particular Harbour (1983)
 Riddles in the Sand (1984)
 Last Mango in Paris (1985)
 Floridays (1986)
 Hot Water (1988)
 Off to See the Lizard (1989)
 Fruitcakes (1994)
 Barometer Soup (1995)
 Banana Wind (1996)
 Christmas Island (1996)
 Don't Stop the Carnival (1998)
 Beach House on the Moon (1999)
 Far Side of the World (2002)
 License to Chill (2004)
 Take the Weather with You (2006)
 Buffet Hotel (2009)
 Songs from St. Somewhere (2013)
 'Tis the SeaSon (2016)
 Life on the Flip Side (2020)
 Songs You Don't Know by Heart (2020)

Honors
Buffett's hometown of Pascagoula, Mississippi, named a bridge after him in his honor. (Buffett Bridge)

See also
 List of bestselling music artists
 A Pirate Looks at Fifty

References

External links

 
 
 "Jimmy Buffett" entry at the Encyclopedia of Alabama

 
1946 births
20th-century American novelists
21st-century American non-fiction writers
21st-century American novelists
ABC Records artists
American autobiographers
American aviators
American brewers
American children's writers
American country rock singers
American country singer-songwriters
American entertainment industry businesspeople
American folk rock musicians
American male non-fiction writers
American male novelists
American male pop singers
American male short story writers
American rock musicians
American rock singers
American short story writers
Auburn University alumni
Coral Reefer Band members
Dunhill Records artists
Easy listening musicians
Gulf and Western musicians
Living people
Musicians from Mobile, Alabama
Novelists from Alabama
Novelists from Mississippi
American film score composers
American film producers
Pearl River Community College alumni
People from Fairhope, Alabama
People from Key West, Florida
People from Pascagoula, Mississippi
People from Sag Harbor, New York
Singer-songwriters from Mississippi
University of Southern Mississippi alumni
Varèse Sarabande Records artists
20th-century American male writers
21st-century American male writers
Singer-songwriters from Alabama